1996–97 Albanian Cup was the forty-fifth season of Albania's annual cup competition. The football competition began in August 1996 with the First Round and ended on 3 May 1997 with the Final match. The winners of the competition qualified for the 1997-98 first round of the UEFA Cup. KF Tirana were the defending champions, having won their ninth Albanian Cup last season. The cup was won by Partizani.

Except of semifinals, other rounds were played in a two-legged format similar to those of European competitions. If the aggregated score was tied after both games, the team with the higher number of away goals advanced. If the number of away goals was equal in both games, the match was decided by extra time and a penalty shootout, if necessary.

First round
Games were played on August & September 1996

|}

Second round
All sixteen teams of the 1995–96 Superliga and First Division entered in this round. First and second legs were played in January 1997.

|}

Quarter-finals
In this round entered the 8 winners from the previous round.

|}

Semi-finals
In this round entered the four winners from the previous round.

|}

Final

References

 Calcio Mondiale Web

External links
 Official website 

Cup
1996–97 domestic association football cups
1996-97